The Vișa is a left tributary of the river Târnava Mare in Romania. It discharges into the Târnava Mare in Copșa Mică.

Tributaries

The following rivers are tributaries to the river Vișa (from source to mouth):

Left: Râura, Pârâul Popii
Right: Slimnic, Valea Rușilor, Calva, Râpa, Șoala

References

Rivers of Romania
Rivers of Sibiu County